Clube Atlético Mineiro is a football club based in Belo Horizonte, Brazil that competes in Campeonato Brasileiro, the top tier of the Brazilian football league system, as well as in the Campeonato Mineiro, the premier state league of Minas Gerais. Since its founding in 1908, the club has had 46 different presidents, including acting ones. The club is formally a civil association, managed by a Board which is elected for a three-year term by a Deliberative Council.

Club founder Margival Mendes Leal was Atlético Mineiro's first president in 1908. Nelson Campos is Atlético's longest-serving president, with a total of nine years in the office in three terms. Alexandre Kalil is the president under whom the club has won the most official trophies, with six. Sérgio Coelho is the club's president since 2021.

Presidents

Below is the official presidential history of Clube Atlético Mineiro, starting from club-founder Margival Mendes Leal in 1908.
Italics denote an acting president.

References

Presidents
Clube Atlético Mineiro presidents